The Celebrity Apprentice is an American television reality competition series. It was a variation of The Apprentice series, hosted by then real estate developer (later 45th president of the United States) Donald Trump from 2008 to 2015, and actor and former California Governor Arnold Schwarzenegger from January to August 2017, when it was canceled.

Like its precursor, the show's opening theme song is "For the Love of Money" by The O'Jays. Unlike its precursor, Celebrity Apprentice consists of celebrities as competing apprentices rather than unknowns. Some of the celebrities featured are contemporary while others have been out of the public eye for some time. They compete to win money for a charitable organization of their choice, and come from various mass media fields, including radio and television and professional sport.

The Celebrity Apprentice was linked in seasons to its precursor TV show, The Apprentice, which consisted of seasons one to six and season ten. The Celebrity Apprentice consists of seasons seven to nine and eleven to fifteen.

Format

The format of The Celebrity Apprentice followed that of the original The Apprentice, outside of housing arrangements; there was no communal living space, and celebrities were not required to live in the city during filming, allowing them to maintain their own appearance schedule which may have caused them to miss out on tasks at times. The two teams were given separate suites near the boardroom which they can use for planning and other activities related to the tasks.

Additionally, the celebrities as contestants were not vying for a job, but instead each had selected a charity for which they were playing. The winner of each season got a large donation made to that charity by the host, but in addition, winning project managers may also have received additional charity money by winning a task, either as a fixed amount set by the host and/or a participating business, or by the total charitable take they made on the task. The host also had discretion to provide charity funds to eliminated celebrities as a consolation prize.

History
On July 6, 2007, it was announced that The Apprentice had been renewed for a seventh season, with a possibility of an eighth. In an effort to revitalize interest in the series, season seven featured celebrities playing the game to raise money for charities, going under the name The Celebrity Apprentice as opposed to continuing under The Apprentice format. British tabloid editor Piers Morgan was declared the winner of that season. On January 28, 2008, NBC confirmed that season eight would feature celebrities playing the game to raise money for charity. That season premiered in March 2009, and resulted in a win for comedian Joan Rivers.

Season three of The Celebrity Apprentice aired in the spring of 2010, and was won by musician Bret Michaels.

On March 17, 2010, NBC officially stated that a new season of the original Apprentice would be brought back, with the explanation that regular working people would again attract audiences in light of the damaged U.S. economy. That season premiered September 16, 2010. This time the ratings were low, and both Trump and Producer Mark Burnett returned to the 'Celebrity' format, which saw John Rich win in season four. In season five, late night host Arsenio Hall won. In season six, the first all-star season took place, bringing back 14 of the most memorable celebrities to compete for the first title of the All-Star Celebrity Apprentice, which country singer Trace Adkins won. In season seven, Donald Trump returned the show to the regular Celebrity Apprentice format; TV anchor and talk show host Leeza Gibbons won the season.

After Trump announced his intentions to run for President of the United States in the 2016 election in 2015, NBC began to re-evaluate their business relationship with Trump and whether he could still be host of The Apprentice series. NBC stated that they opted to sever their business ties with Trump following "derogatory statements by Donald Trump regarding immigrants" in June 2015, and began seeking a new host for the show. However, Trump stated that it was his decision to end the relationship with NBC "out of respect", even though he had been approached by Burnett and NBC to host two more seasons of the show just prior to his presidential bid. In an April 2016 interview, Trump revealed he earned about $213 million from the show over its 14 seasons.

In September 2015, NBC announced that actor and politician Arnold Schwarzenegger would become the new host of The Celebrity Apprentice to premiere during the 2016–17 television season. The rebooted series, The New Celebrity Apprentice first broadcast on January 2, 2017. Trump will remain credited as an Executive Producer to the show, including what is estimated as a five-figure per-show fee as well as ongoing profits from the franchise through MGM, the production entity for the show.

On March 3, 2017, NBC announced that Arnold Schwarzenegger stepped down as host of The Celebrity Apprentice, leaving the show's future up in the air. Schwarzenegger cited poor ratings as well as his feud with President Trump as factors in his decision.

Statistics by season 
Seasonal rankings (based on average total viewers per episode) of The Celebrity Apprentice on NBC.
Note: Given that the show is a sequel television series, the below "statistics by season" chart is a continuation from its precursor's (The Apprentice) "statistics by season" chart. Note as well that season 10 is omitted from the chart below as the show reverted to The Apprentice for that season.

Candidates by season 
Note: Winners are indicated in Bold; second-place finishers are indicated in Italics.

Celebrity Apprentice 1 (season 7) 

 Trace Adkins
 Carol Alt
 Stephen Baldwin
 Nadia Comaneci
 Tiffany Fallon
 Jennie Finch
 Nely Galán
 Marilu Henner
 Lennox Lewis
 Piers Morgan
 Tito Ortiz
 Omarosa
 Vincent Pastore
 Gene Simmons

Celebrity Apprentice 2 (season 8) 

 Clint Black
 Andrew Dice Clay
 Annie Duke
 Tom Green
 Natalie Gulbis
 Scott Hamilton
 Jesse James
 Claudia Jordan
 Khloé Kardashian
 Brian McKnight
 Joan Rivers
 Melissa Rivers
 Brande Roderick
 Dennis Rodman
 Herschel Walker
 Tionne "T-Boz" Watkins

Celebrity Apprentice 3 (season 9) 

 Rod Blagojevich
 Selita Ebanks
 Bill Goldberg
 Michael Johnson
 Maria Kanellis
 Cyndi Lauper
 Carol Leifer
 Bret Michaels
 Sharon Osbourne
 Holly Robinson Peete
 Summer Sanders
 Sinbad
 Curtis Stone
 Darryl Strawberry

Celebrity Apprentice 4 (season 11) 

 Gary Busey
 Jose Canseco
 David Cassidy
 Hope Dworaczyk
 Richard Hatch
 La Toya Jackson
 Star Jones
 NeNe Leakes
 Lil Jon
 Marlee Matlin
 Mark McGrath
 John Rich
 Lisa Rinna
 Niki Taylor
 Dionne Warwick
 Meat Loaf

Celebrity Apprentice 5 (season 12) 

 Clay Aiken
 Michael Andretti
 Adam Carolla
 Tia Carrere
 Lou Ferrigno
 Debbie Gibson
 Teresa Giudice
 Victoria Gotti
 Arsenio Hall
 Penn Jillette
 Lisa Lampanelli
 Dayana Mendoza
 Aubrey O'Day
 Dee Snider
 George Takei
 Paul Teutul Sr.
 Cheryl Tiegs
 Patricia Velásquez

Celebrity Apprentice 6 (season 13) 

 Trace Adkins
 Stephen Baldwin
 Gary Busey
 Marilu Henner
 La Toya Jackson
 Penn Jillette
 Claudia Jordan
 Lil Jon
 Bret Michaels
 Omarosa
 Lisa Rinna
 Brande Roderick
 Dennis Rodman
 Dee Snider

Celebrity Apprentice 7 (season 14) 

 Jamie Anderson
 Johnny Damon
 Vivica A. Fox
 Leeza Gibbons
 Brandi Glanville
 Kate Gosselin
 Gilbert Gottfried
 Sig Hansen
 Shawn Johnson
 Kevin Jonas
 Lorenzo Lamas
 Kenya Moore
 Terrell Owens
 Keshia Knight Pulliam
 Geraldo Rivera
 Ian Ziering

The New Celebrity Apprentice (season 15)

 Laila Ali
 Brooke Burke-Charvet
 Eric Dickerson
 Boy George
 Matt Iseman
 Carrie Keagan
 Carson Kressley
 Lisa Leslie
 Jon Lovitz
 Vince Neil
 Nicole "Snooki" Polizzi
 Kyle Richards
 Chael Sonnen
 Porsha Williams
 Ricky Williams
 Carnie Wilson

Similar shows in other nations 
 The Celebrity Apprentice Australia
 Celebrity Apprentice Ireland
 Comic Relief Does The Apprentice (UK)
 Sport Relief Does The Apprentice (UK)
 Kandidaten (Norwegian)

References

External links
 
 Full episodes (available in the U.S. and Canada)

2008 American television series debuts
2017 American television series endings
2000s American reality television series
2010s American reality television series
The Apprentice (American TV series)
Television series by Trump Productions
Celebrity reality television series
Television series by MGM Television